The  was a class of minesweepers of the Imperial Japanese Navy (IJN), serving during World War II. 22 vessels were planned and built in 1941–43 under the Maru Rin Programme (Ship # 251–256) and the Maru Kyū Programme (Ship # 480–495).

Background
 In 1938, the IJN was troubled by drifting contact mines from the National Revolutionary Army at Yangtze River. The IJN dispatched a lot of minesweepers and paravane equipment vessels (minelayers, torpedo boats and more) to Yangtze River, but they were damaged by a drifting contact mines too.
 The IJN wanted a small and light-footed minesweepers. The IJN already commandeered a lot of fishing boats and gave minesweeping operations to them. The Kampon designed minesweeper similar to the trawlers. It is No.1-class auxiliary minesweeper (Project Number I5).
 They have begun to be commissioned from 1942. However, all of them was dispatched to Pacific front, and they were no match for the magnetic mine because their hull was made by steel.

Ships in class

Photos

Notes

Bibliography
, History of Pacific War Vol.51 The truth histories of the Japanese Naval Vessels Part-2, Gakken (Japan), August 2005, .
Ships of the World special issue Vol.45, Escort Vessels of the Imperial Japanese Navy, (Japan), 1996.
The Maru Special, Japanese Naval Vessels No.50, Japanese minesweepers and landing ships,  (Japan), 1981.

 
World War II mine warfare vessels of Japan
Minesweepers of Japan
Mine warfare vessel classes